Ronald Staveley Payne (6 February 1926 – 25 May 2013), or Ronnie Payne, was a British journalist and war correspondent who focused on espionage and terrorism.

Early life
Ronald Payne was born on 6 February 1926 in Ripon, Yorkshire, England. His father was a Primitive Methodist minister.

Payne was educated at Pocklington Grammar School and Bedford School. During World War II, he served in the Royal Marines. He subsequently attended Jesus College, Oxford.

Career
Payne began his career as a journalist at the Reading Mercury. He subsequently wrote for the London Evening Standard. In 1953, he joined the Daily Telegraph, first as a reporter and later as a foreign correspondent in Paris. He wrote about French Algeria and French Indochina. He also wrote about the Suez Crisis in 1956, and he interviewed Muammar Gaddafi in 1976.

Payne co-authored several books with Christopher Dobson. He was also the author of six non-fiction books about espionage or terrorism.

Personal life and death
Payne was married three times. His third wife, Celia Haddon, was a journalist. They retired in Witney, Oxfordshire.

Payne died on 25 May 2013 in Witney.

Works

References

1926 births
2013 deaths
People from Ripon
People from Witney
People educated at Bedford School
Royal Marines personnel of World War II
Alumni of Jesus College, Oxford
English non-fiction writers
Espionage writers
Military personnel from Yorkshire
Royal Marines ranks
British republicans